Belad Motaleb or Balad Matlab or Belad Motlab or Belad-e Motalleb, also rendered as Badmutlab, may refer to:
 Belad Motaleb-e Olya
 Belad Motaleb-e Sofla